St Giles' Church, Holme is a Grade I listed parish church in the Church of England in Holme, Nottinghamshire.

History

The church dates from the 12th century, and was largely rebuilt in the early 15th century by John Barton.

It is part of a group of parishes which includes 
St Bartholomew's Church, Langford
St Cecilia's Church, Girton
All Saints' Church, Harby
St George the Martyr's Church, North & South Clifton
All Saints' Church, Collingham
St John the Baptist's Church, Collingham
St Helena's Church, South Scarle
Holy Trinity Church, Besthorpe
St Helen's Church, Thorney
All Saints' Church, Winthorpe

Cadaver tomb

The church is noted for the founder's cadaver tomb. John Barton was a prosperous wool merchant who died in 1491. His wealth accumulated from sheep was acknowledged in stone and stained-glass in his now-gone home 'I thank God and ever shall, It is the shepe that hath payed for all' (sic) he founded St. Giles' church and built his tomb during his lifetime with his memento mori below. At his feet is his rebus - a barrel (tun) with a bar across it for 'Barton'.

References

Church of England church buildings in Nottinghamshire
Grade I listed churches in Nottinghamshire